The 1999–2000 European Hockey League was the fourth and last  edition of the European Hockey League. The season started on September 21, 1999, and finished on February 6, 2000.

The tournament was won by Metallurg Magnitogorsk, who beat HC Sparta Praha in the final.

The points system used in the first round of the tournament was: the winner in regular time won 3 points; in case of a tie, an overtime is played, the winner in overtime won 2 points and the loser in overtime won 1 point.

First round

Group A

Group A standings

Group B

Group B standings

Group C

Group C standings

Group D

Group D standings

Quarterfinals

Final stage
(Lugano, Ticino, Switzerland)

Semifinals

Third place match

Final

References
 Season 2000

1999–2000 in European ice hockey leagues
European Hockey League